Wizipan Little Elk is a community leader of the Rosebud Sioux Tribe who seeks to improve the wellbeing of Native Americans in the United States through governmental and economic policies.

Political career 
Wizipan joined then-Senator Barack Obama's presidential campaign in 2008 as a Native American Outreach Coordinator and was promoted to the First Americans Vote director. Once Obama was elected president, Wizipan became part of the transition team, the First Americans Public Liaison. Later, he was named deputy chief of staff to the United States Department of the Interior Assistant Secretary of Indian Affairs.

Community activism 
In 2011, Wizipan returned to Rosebud Indian Reservation, and became CEO of the Rosebud Economic Development Corporation (REDCO).

Wizipan is a board member of the Native American Contractors Association.

Awards 
In both 2019 and 2020 he was awarded Native American Agriculture Fund (NAAF) grants. In 2021, Wizipan was awarded a Bush Foundation fellowship.

References

External links 
 Wizipan Little Elk's CV
 Wizipan Little's Elk's website
 REDCO's website

Native Americans in South Dakota
People from Rosebud Indian Reservation, South Dakota
Political chiefs of staff
Barack Obama 2008 presidential campaign
United States Bureau of Indian Affairs personnel
Native American politicians
Obama administration personnel
Year of birth missing (living people)
Living people